The freguesias (civil parishes) of Portugal are listed here by municipality according to the following format:
 concelho
 freguesias

Fafe
Aboim
Agrela
Antime
Ardegão
Armil
Arnozela
Arões (Santa Cristina)
Arões (São Romão)
Cepães
Estorãos
Fafe
Fareja
Felgueiras
Fornelos
Freitas
Golães
Gontim
Medelo
Monte
Moreira do Rei
Passos
Pedraído
Queimadela
Quinchães
Regadas
Revelhe
Ribeiros
São Gens
Seidões
Serafão
Silvares (São Clemente)
Silvares (São Martinho)
Travassós
Várzea Cova
Vila Cova
Vinhós

Faro
Conceição
Estói
Faro (São Pedro)
Faro (Sé)
Montenegro
Santa Bárbara de Nexe

Felgueiras
Aião
Airães
Borba de Godim
Caramos
Friande
Idães
Jugueiros
Lagares

Macieira da Lixa
Margaride (Santa Eulália)
Moure
Pedreira
Penacova
Pinheiro
Pombeiro de Ribavizela
Rande
Refontoura
Regilde
Revinhade
Santão
Sendim
Sernande
Sousa
Torrados
Unhão
Várzea
Varziela
Vila Cova da Lixa
Vila Fria
Vila Verde
Vizela (São Jorge)

Ferreira do Alentejo
Alfundão
Canhestros
Ferreira do Alentejo
Figueira dos Cavaleiros
Odivelas
Peroguarda

Ferreira do Zêzere
Águas Belas
Areias
Beco
Chãos
Dornes
Ferreira do Zêzere
Igreja Nova do Sobral
Paio Mendes
Pias

Figueira da Foz
Alhadas
Alqueidão
Bom Sucesso
Borda do Campo
Brenha
Buarcos
Ferreira-a-Nova
Lavos
Maiorca
Marinha das Ondas
Moinhos da Gândara
Paião
Quiaios
Santana
São Julião da Figueira da Foz
São Pedro
Tavarede
Vila Verde

Figueira de Castelo Rodrigo
Algodres
Almofala
Castelo Rodrigo
Cinco Vilas
Colmeal
Escalhão
Escarigo
Figueira de Castelo Rodrigo
Freixeda do Torrão
Mata de Lobos
Penha de Águia
Quintã de Pêro Martins
Reigada
Vale de Afonsinho
Vermiosa
Vilar de Amargo
Vilar Torpim

Figueiró dos Vinhos
Aguda
Arega
Bairradas
Campelo
Figueiró dos Vinhos

Fornos de Algodres
Algodres
Casal Vasco
Cortiçô
Figueiró da Granja
Fornos de Algodres
Fuinhas
Infias
Juncais
Maceira
Matança
Muxagata
Queiriz
Sobral Pichorro
Vila Chã
Vila Ruiva
Vila Soeiro do Chão

Freixo de Espada à Cinta
Fornos
Freixo de Espada à Cinta
Lagoaça
Ligares
Mazouco
Poiares

Fronteira
Cabeço de Vide
Fronteira
São Saturnino

Funchal (Madeira)
 Imaculado Coração de Maria
 Monte
 Santa Luzia
 Santa Maria Maior
 Santo António
 São Gonçalo
 São Martinho
 São Pedro
 São Roque
 Sé

Fundão
Alcaide
Alcaria
Alcongosta
Aldeia de Joanes
Aldeia Nova do Cabo
Alpedrinha
Atalaia do Campo
Barroca
Bogas de Baixo
Bogas de Cima
Capinha
Castelejo
Castelo Novo
Donas
Enxames
Escarigo
Fatela
Fundão
Janeiro de Cima
Lavacolhos
Mata da Rainha
Orca
Pêro Viseu
Póvoa de Atalaia
Salgueiro
Silvares
Soalheira
Souto da Casa
Telhado
Vale de Prazeres
Valverde

F